MV Thorco Cloud was a general cargo ship owned by Thorco Projects that sank in the Singapore Strait in December 2015 after a collision with the chemical tanker MV Stolt Commitment. The collision resulted in six casualties from a total crew of 12. The wreck was removed in 2019.

Construction
The ship was constructed by Damen shipyards in Galați, Romania where it was started, and Foxhol, The Netherlands where it was completed. The ship was launched in July 2004 as the MV S. Partner and was one of a series of identical sister ships.

History
The ship has undergone name and Flag State changes throughout its service life, including:
MV S. Partner flagged in the Marshall Islands.
 MV UAL Gabon flagged in the Marshall Islands.
 MV Molene flagged in Antigua and Barbuda.
 MV BBC Brazil flagged in Antigua and Barbuda.
 MV Thorco Cloud flagged in Antigua and Barbuda.

Collision and sinking

On 16 December 2015 the ship departed the port of Batu Ampar, Indonesia with a crew of 12 bound for Durban, South Africa and loaded with a cargo of railway rails. During Thorco Cloud'''s transit into the Singapore Strait traffic separation scheme, chemical tanker MV Stolt Commitment collided with Thorco Cloud, breaking the ship into two parts and causing them both to sink within the strait. The bow section of the Thorco Cloud continued to float after the collision and drifted, while the aft section containing the bridge and engine room sank almost immediately. Six crew members were rescued from the incident, and six more crew members were declared missing, later found deceased.

The Standard P&I Club instructed Guangzhou Salvage to recover the wreck of the Thorco Cloud'', which was performed in 2019.

References

Maritime incidents in 2015
2004 ships